Tetratheca ericifolia is a species of flowering plant in the quandong family that is endemic to Australia.

Description
The species grows as a diffuse or compact shrub to 15–40 cm in height, and with stems covered with pale brown bristles. The linear leaves are 3–10 mm long and 1–1.5 mm wide. The flowers are lilac-pink, with petals 5–12.5 mm long, appearing throughout the year, but mainly from July to December.

Distribution and habitat
The species is found from Nabiac southwards to the Nimmitabel area in eastern New South Wales, where the plants grow in heathland and dry sclerophyll forest on sandy soils.

References

ericifolia
Flora of New South Wales
Oxalidales of Australia
Taxa named by James Edward Smith
Plants described in 1805